Allium abbasii is a species of onion native to Iran.

References

abbasii
Flora of Iran